Boam is a surname. Notable people with this surname include:

 Anthony Boam (born 1932), British commander
 Harry Boam (born 1990), New Zealand cricketer
 Jeffrey Boam (1946–2000), American screenwriter and film producer
 Stuart Boam (born 1948), English football player and manager